Bahram Beygi-ye Olya Samandi (also Romanized as Bahrām Beygī-ye ‘Olyā Samandī; also known as Bahrāmbeygī) is a village in Pataveh Rural District, Pataveh District, Dana County, Kohgiluyeh and Boyer-Ahmad Province, Iran. At the 2006 census, its population was 921, in 169 families.

References 

Populated places in Dana County